John Benjamin "Jobe" Murphy (born 16 October 1992 in Huddersfield, England) is a former rugby league footballer who played primarily as a . He played for the Bradford Bulls in the Super League and for the Dewsbury Rams. He also represented Ireland at international level.

Bradford Bulls
2012 - 2012 Season

Murphy featured on the bench in the pre-season games against Castleford Tigers and Dewsbury Rams. He was promoted to a starting second row spot in the friendly against Keighley Cougars.

2013 - 2013 Season

Murphy featured in the two pre-season friendlies against Dewsbury Rams and Leeds Rhinos.

He made his début in Round 3 (Castleford Tigers). He featured in three consecutive games from Round 6 (Widnes Vikings) to Round 8 (Catalans Dragons). He was released at the end of the season.

Dewsbury Rams

Murphy was dual registered with Dewsbury Rams for the 2013 season. He featured against Whitehaven, Halifax, Sheffield Eagles and Swinton Lions.

At the end of the 2014 season, Jobe played for Ireland in the 2014 European Cup tournament.

In early pre-season 2015, Jobe failed to show up to trainings and therefore had his contract terminated by head coach Glenn Morrison. It was found out he 'privately' quit rugby league due to increased work commitments.

Statistics

References

External links
2012 Bradford Bulls profile

1992 births
Living people
Bradford Bulls players
Dewsbury Rams players
English rugby league players
Rugby league locks
Rugby league players from Huddersfield
Rugby league second-rows
Ireland national rugby league team players